Gregory 'Bonga' Perkins (born 1972 in Oahu, Hawaii and raised in Honolulu.) is an American professional longboard surfrider and two-time ASP World Longboard Champion.

Perkins won his first ASP World Longboard Championship title in 1996, defeating Alex Salazar (Brazil) in the final. In 2008, he reclaimed the world title by beating France's Antoine Delpero in the final at San Clemente, California. He finished as a runner up three times in 1994, 1997 and 2002. He also finished third in the ASP World Tour on six occasions in 1995, 1997, 2003, 2004, 2007 and 2009.

References

1972 births
American surfers
Sportspeople from Hawaii
People from Honolulu County, Hawaii
Living people
World Surf League surfers